Cumayeri District is a district of the Düzce Province of Turkey. Its seat is the town of Cumayeri. Its area is 113 km2, and its population is 15,214 (2022).

Composition
There is one municipality in Cumayeri District:
 Cumayeri

There are 21 villages in Cumayeri District:

 Akpınar
 Avlayan
 Büyükmelen
 Çamlıpınar
 Çelikdere
 Dokuzdeğirmen
 Esentepe
 Hamascık
 Harmankaya
 Iğdır
 Kızılüzüm
 Mısırlık
 Ordulukaradere
 Ören
 Sırtpınar
 Subaşı
 Taşlık
 Üvezbeli
 Yenitepe
 Yeşiltepe
 Yukarıavlayan

References

Districts of Düzce Province